Radyr railway station is a railway station serving the Radyr area of Cardiff, South Wales. It is at the foot of the hill at the eastern edge of the village, alongside the River Taff and adjacent to the Taff Trail. The station is on the Merthyr Line, and is also the northern terminus of the City Line.

History
Radyr was originally a major railway junction and the location of sidings forming a marshalling yard for freight trains used in the industries in the Glamorgan valleys. It was first opened by the Taff Vale Railway in June 1883, and was originally named Penarth Junction. At one time there were four running lines through the station, up and down passenger and up and down goods on the Taff Vale main line to the valleys northwards and via Llandaff to Cardiff and the docks to the south east. Immediately south of the station, the Cardiff City line diverged southwards and reached the east side of Cardiff via Waterhall Junction, en route to the harbour at Penarth. The marshalling yard was south of the station in the fork between the running lines.
 
Following the down-turn in coal traffic; the marshalling yard closed (in 1993) and the sidings were greatly rationalised, becoming a permanent way depot. The platforms were also rationalised, from five to two, one up and one down.

Redevelopment

In 1987 passenger services were introduced on the City Line by British Rail. This made Radyr a bottleneck, as the terminating trains coming from that line occupied the down platform and delays along the line to the Valleys were inevitable. It also allowed diversions for through trains which was beneficial.

Redesigned as a commuter station in 1998, major renovations took place, resulting in the two freight lines being replaced by a third platform, eliminating the problem of congestion. Also, a new ticket office was built and modern shelters replaced the old waiting area. These renovations coincided with the upgrades along the Taff Main Line, where the most of the track was replaced between Cardiff and Pontypridd, and the old-fashioned semaphore signals were replaced with modern, colour light signals worked from a new panel box here (this supervises the Rhondda Line all the way to ).

These renovation allowed the last of the old sidings to be removed, redeveloped for parking and as a housing development.

Present

Today the station, operated by Transport for Wales, has three platforms.

Extensive upgrading and modernisation works were completed in late 2017 by Network Rail as part of the Metro project which included improved access to all platforms by a new footbridge. A larger car park has also been provided to supplement the original which provides much better facilities including good lighting. Wheelchair access is now provided to all platforms via lifts.

The ticket office is staffed in peak morning hours. Travel time into  is 15 minutes on all lines.

In July 2007, members of the Radyr Comprehensive Green Flag Committee formally adopted the station and now frequently check that the station is clean and that all amenities are working. This link ties in with a community response to ensure that railway crime is stamped out.

Services

A reduced service operates on Sundays, with no trains on the City line.

See also
List of railway stations in Cardiff

References

External links

Railway stations in Cardiff
DfT Category E stations
Former Taff Vale Railway stations
Railway stations in Great Britain opened in 1863
Railway stations served by Transport for Wales Rail
Radyr
1883 establishments in Wales